The 1980 United Airlines Sunbird Cup, also known as the United Airlines Tournament of Champions, was a women's tennis tournament played on outdoor hard courts at the Grenelefe Golf & Tennis Resort in Haines City, Florida in the United States. It was part of the Colgate Series circuit of the 1980 WTA Tour and classified as a category AAAA event. It was the inaugural edition of the tournament and was held from April 29 through May 4, 1980. Only a singles competition was held for which players qualified who had won a WTA tournament with more than $20,000 prize money during the previous year. First-seeded Martina Navratilova won the title at the event and earned $50,000 first-prize money.

Finals

Singles
 Martina Navratilova defeated  Tracy Austin 6–2, 6–2
It was Navratilova's 8th singles title of the year and the 42nd of her career.

Prize money

Notes

References

External links
 ITF tournament edition details

United Airlines Tournament of Champions
1980
1980 in sports in Florida
1980 in American tennis
April 1980 sports events in the United States
May 1980 sports events in the United States